Sex-lethal (Sxl) is a gene found in Dipteran insects, named for its mutation phenotype in Drosophila melanogaster. It is most closely related to the ELAV/HUD subfamily of splicing factors.

In fruit flies, this protein participates in alternative splicing of the transformer gene, deciding the sex of the fly. It induces female-specific alternative splicing of the transformer (tra) pre-mRNA by binding to the tra uridine-rich polypyrimidine tract at the non-sex-specific 3' splice site during the sex-determination process. SXL binds also to its own pre-mRNA and promotes female-specific alternative splicing. SXL contains an N-terminal Gly/Asn-rich domain that may be responsible for the protein-protein interaction, and tandem RNA recognition motifs (RRMs) that show high preference to bind single-stranded, uridine-rich target RNA transcripts.

References 

Protein families
Drosophila melanogaster genes